Edward Alexander Frederick Harenc (14 June 1814 – 3 August 1853) was an English clergyman and first-class cricketer who played for Cambridge University in 1840 and 1841. He was born at Foots Cray in Kent and died at Broadstairs, also in Kent. He was buried at Foots Cray alongside his wife.

One of a series of cricketing brothers, the most prolific of whom was Charles Harenc, Edward Harenc played in a single match for a Gentlemen of Kent side in 1837 and then in three matches while at Cambridge University, the last of which was the 1841 University Match against Oxford University. Harenc opened the innings for Cambridge in the first innings, and came in at first wicket down in the second, but his scores were 0 and 2 in a very tight game won by Cambridge by only eight runs.

Career outside cricket
Harenc was educated at Magdalene College, Cambridge. He was ordained as a priest on graduation and was priest in charge of the parish of Longcot, then in Berkshire (now in Oxfordshire), from 1846 to 1853.

Aside from Charles, his other brothers Archibald and Henry also played first-class cricket.

References

1814 births
1853 deaths
English cricketers
Cambridge University cricketers
Alumni of Magdalene College, Cambridge
19th-century English Anglican priests
Gentlemen of Kent cricketers